Carlos Adolfo Urueta (1873 – September 13, 1931) was a Colombian statesman. He was the Ambassador of Colombia to the United States from June 11, 1917 to October 15, 1921. He was the Minister of Foreign Affairs in 1921. He was the Minister of National Defense starting on July 27, 1931 to his death.

Biography
He was born in 1873 in Ayapel, Colombia and he attended the University of Bolivar, at Cartagena.

He was the Ambassador of Colombia to the United States starting on June 11, 1917 and was succeeded by Carlos Uribe on October 15, 1921.

He was the Minister of Foreign Affairs in 1921. He was the Minister of National Defense starting on July 27, 1931 to his death.

He died on September 13, 1931.

References

1873 births
1931 deaths
Foreign ministers of Colombia
Ambassadors of Colombia to the United States
Colombian Ministers of Defense